Yang Haoran (born 22 February 1996) is a Chinese sport shooter. He has collected a career tally of fourteen medals (nine golds and five silver) and broke eight world junior records in air rifle shooting at major international competitions, spanning the Youth Olympics, Asian Games, World Championships, and World Cup series. Having pursued the sport since age 12, Yang trained full-time as a member of the Chinese shooting team, at the sports academy in Chengde, under his personal coach and 2000 Olympic champion Cai Yalin.

Yang took part in his first international competition as a 17-year-old at the 2013 ISSF World Cup final meet in Munich, Germany, where he claimed the gold medal in the 10 m air rifle, finishing in first with 205.9 points, ahead of World Champion Niccolo Campriani.

When China hosted the 2014 Summer Youth Olympics in Nanjing, Yang maintained a comfortable lead over the rest of the field to win the gold medal for his team in the boys' 10 m air rifle with a record of 209.3. Less than a month later, Yang captured his first ever title at the World Championships in Granada, Spain, setting a new junior world record of 632.1 points. Yang's win vaulted him to the top of the world rankings and also granted him one of the six Olympic quota places for Rio 2016.

On his senior debut at the Asian Games in Incheon, South Korea, Yang added another individual gold to his career tally by leading the medal haul for China in the 10 m air rifle with a score of 209.6 points. Yang's win also helped his fellow shooters Cao Yifei and Liu Tianyou deliver a first-place finish over the rest of the field in the team event, finishing with an aggregated tally of 1886.4.

See also
List of Youth Olympic Games gold medalists who won Olympic gold medals

References

External links

Nanjing 2014 Profile

1996 births
Living people
Chinese male sport shooters
Shooters at the 2014 Summer Youth Olympics
Shooters at the 2014 Asian Games
Shooters at the 2018 Asian Games
Asian Games medalists in shooting
People from Chengde
Sport shooters from Hebei
ISSF rifle shooters
Shooters at the 2016 Summer Olympics
Olympic shooters of China
Asian Games gold medalists for China
Asian Games silver medalists for China
Medalists at the 2014 Asian Games
Medalists at the 2018 Asian Games
Universiade medalists in shooting
Universiade gold medalists for China
Universiade silver medalists for China
Universiade bronze medalists for China
Youth Olympic gold medalists for China
Medalists at the 2015 Summer Universiade
Medalists at the 2020 Summer Olympics
Olympic medalists in shooting
Shooters at the 2020 Summer Olympics
Olympic gold medalists for China
Olympic bronze medalists for China